Esporte Clube Avenida, commonly referred to as Avenida, is a Brazilian football club based in Santa Cruz do Sul, Rio Grande do Sul. It currently plays in Campeonato Gaúcho Série A1, the first level of the Rio Grande do Sul state football league.

History
The club was founded on January 6, 1944. Avenida merged with Futebol Clube Santa Cruz, its rival, in the 1960s to form Associação Santa Cruz do Futebol, due to financial difficulties, but the merger was a failure, and both clubs continued being separate teams. Between 1990 and 1997, the club's football department was closed. They competed in the Campeonato Gaúcho in 2000 and in 2001. Avenida won the Campeonato Gaúcho Second Level in 2011.

Achievements
 Campeonato Gaúcho Second Level:
 Winners (1): 2011
 Copa FGF:
 Winners (1): 2018

Stadium
Esporte Clube Avenida play their home games at Estádio dos Eucaliptos. The stadium has a maximum capacity of 3,000 people.

References

External links
 Official website

 
Association football clubs established in 1944
1944 establishments in Brazil